Challain-la-Potherie is a village and a commune in the Maine-et-Loire department in western France.

Twinning
In 2010 Challain-la-Potherie celebrated the tenth anniversary of its accord with the village of Somersham in Suffolk, England.
The accord has been very successful with annual coach trips between the two villages - visits alternating year and year about. Many friendships have been formed and the twinning is particularly strong in the number of children and young people involved.

See also
Communes of the Maine-et-Loire department

References

Challainlapotherie